The Cornwall Curling Club is a curling club in Cornwall, Prince Edward Island, Canada.

History
The Cornwall Village Council decided in 1979 to build a curling rink in the community, and construction began in 1981. The club officially opened in January 1982. Despite a number of hiccups in its first season, it did not take long for the club to produce a provincial champion. Nancy Coffin, Sharon Cole, Pam Sherren, and Heather Worth won the 1983 Prince Edward Island Junior Women's curling championship.

Champions
In addition to winning the 1983 provincial women's junior championships, the club has won several other provincial titles. The club won its first national championship when Lisa Jackson, Carolyn Coulson, Melissa Morrow and Jodi Murphy won the 2015 Travelers Curling Club Championship.

The club won its first PEI Tankard in 2020 when Bryan Cochrane won the title.

References

1982 establishments in Prince Edward Island
Curling clubs in Canada
Buildings and structures in Queens County, Prince Edward Island
Curling in Prince Edward Island